Daza is a surname of the following people

Camilo Daza (1898–1975), Colombian aviator
Camilo Daza International Airport in Colombia
Catherine Daza (born 1982), Colombian beauty pageant 
Esteban Daza, 16th century Spanish composer 
Gabriel Daza (1896–1994), Filipino boy scout 
Hilarión Daza (1840–1894), President of Bolivia
Imelda Daza (born 1948), Colombian-Swedish politician
Isabelle Daza (born 1988), Filipina actress and television host
Juan Daza (fl. 1496–1510), Spanish Roman Catholic prelate 
Odúver Daza, Paralympian sprinter from Venezuela 
Paula Daza (born 1960), Chilean surgeon, pediatrician and politician
Nancy Romero-Daza, American anthropologist 
Nora Daza (1928–2013), Filipino gourmet chef 
Yonathan Daza (born 1994), Venezuelan baseball player
Plácido Vega y Daza (1830–1878), Mexican general